Austrothemis nigrescens is a species of dragonfly of the family Libellulidae, 
commonly known as the swamp flat-tail. 
It is endemic to southern Australia, where it inhabits lakes and swamps.
It is a small dragonfly; the male has a flattened abdomen with black and red markings, and the female has black and yellow markings.

Austrothemis nigrescens is the only species in the genus Austrothemis.

Gallery

See also
 List of Odonata species of Australia

References

Libellulidae
Odonata of Australia
Insects of Australia
Endemic fauna of Australia
Taxa named by René Martin
Insects described in 1901